The Patriotic Union (UP) was the political party created from above by Spanish dictator Miguel Primo de Rivera, conceived as a support to his regime and integrating political Catholicism, technocrats, and the business-owning classes. The party's power was dependent upon the power of its founder and leader, not any popular mandate. Following the dismissal of Miguel Primo de Rivera in January 1930 by King Alfonso XIII, the party was succeeded by the National Monarchist Union.

Membership

There is no reliable information on membership figures. The party review Unión Patriótica claimed in 1927 that there were 1,319,428 people on the rolls; in 1928 the same source reported the figure as 1,696,304. Most historians consider these figures fairly meaningless and note that they probably reflect bureaucratic ingenuity rather than the scale of genuine recruitment. However, some scholars settle for official figures, e.g. in the province of Almería the UP membership is estimated at 30,000 and in mid-size Valencian towns like Gandia, Torrent or Utiel at 500–1,000  members.

An official yet not public note from Primo de Rivera, dated 1929, estimated membership at 600–700,000. Many historians tend to settle for even smaller figures, ranging from 400,000 to 500,000. These estimates are pretty much a guesswork, though some scholars base their calculations on circulation of the UP daily La Nación, at its peak printed in 50,000 copies.

Figures in the range of 1,3–1.7m would suggest the membership rate of some 6–8% (compared to the entire population), figures in the range of 0.4–0.5m would point to some 2%. In comparison to other state parties, in the mid-1930s some 10% of the Italian population were on the rolls of PNF; in 1937 some 8% of Germans were members of NSDAP. The communist state parties of the late 20th century recorded a membership rate between 4% in the USSR to 8–10% in Poland or Czechoslovakia. FET y de las JONS, the state party during the Francoist dictatorship, boasted of some 0.9m members in 1942, around 3% of the Spanish population.

Notes

Conservative parties in Spain
Defunct political parties in Spain
20th century in Spain
Parties of one-party systems
Dictatorship of Primo de Rivera
Monarchist parties in Spain
Catholic political parties